Marcel Bosker  (born 19 January 1997) is a Dutch long track speed skater.

He won the allround bronze medal at the 2018 World Allround Speed Skating Championships in Amsterdam.

Biography
Bosker is the son of parents with a skating career. His mother Henriët Bosker-van der Meer (1967) was Dutch all-round champion in 1989. Father Ronald Bosker also participated in the Dutch championships and finished seventh that same year. After immigrating to Switzerland, both his parents represented Switzerland during the 2003/2004 season onwards. Bosker was born in Switzerland. At the age of 14 he moved to the Netherlands without his parents and stayed with a host family so that he could develop his potential in speed skating.

Records

Personal records

At the end of the 2020–2021 speed skating season Bosker occupied the 18th position on the adelskalender with a score of 146.948 points

World record

Tournament overview

Source:

World Cup overview

 Source: 

 DNF = Did not finish
 DNQ = Did not qualify
 – = Did not participate
 (b) = Division B
 * = 10.000 meter
 GWC = Grand World Cup

Medals won

References

External links

1997 births
Living people
Dutch male speed skaters
People from Kulm District
World Allround Speed Skating Championships medalists
World Single Distances Speed Skating Championships medalists
Speed skaters at the 2022 Winter Olympics
Olympic speed skaters of the Netherlands